Over the Rainbow is singer-songwriter Livingston Taylor's third album, released in 1973. Its eleven tracks include nine of his own compositions, as well as two cover versions: "Over the Rainbow", from The Wizard of Oz, and George Harrison's "If I Needed Someone".

Track listing
All tracks composed by Livingston Taylor, except where indicated.

"Loving Be My New Horizon" – 1:45
"Pretty Woman" (N. Clafin, Taylor) – 2:31
"Falling In Love With You" – 2:23
"I Can Dream of You" – 3:02
"Blind" – 3:36
"Over the Rainbow" (Harold Arlen, E.Y. Harburg) – 2:41
"Rodeo" – 2:53
"Lady Tomorrow" – 2:41
"If I Needed Someone" (George Harrison) – 2:56
"Let Me Go Down" – 3:19
"Oh Hallelujah" – 3:46

Personnel
Livingston Taylor – guitar, keyboards, vocals
Gloria Agostini – harp
Victor Brady – piano, steel guitar, steel piano
Neil Larsen – keyboards
Chuck Leavell – keyboards
Tony Levin – bass guitar
Mike Mainieri – percussion, marimba, vibraphone
George Marge – clarinet, clavinet
Rick Marotta – drums, percussion
Jim Nalls – guitar
Walter Robinson – bass guitar, acoustic bass
Carly Simon – vocals
Maretha Stewart – vocals
Tommy Talton – guitar
Howard "Buzz" Feiten – guitar
James Taylor – vocals
Jim Reeves – mix engineer
Ed Freeman – producer

References

Over The Rainbow
Over The Rainbow
Capricorn Records albums